Blab Happy were a British indie band from Leicester formed in 1987, comprising Mick McCarthy, Jon Dennis, Tony Owen and Jeremy Clay. After two EPs released on their own Wisdom label won airplay on John Peel's BBC Radio 1 show, and enthusiastic reviews in New Musical Express, Sounds and Melody Maker, they were signed by Demon Records offshoot F-Beat, for whom they released 2 albums, 1991's Boat and 1993's Smothered.  The NMEs Gina Morris, wrote of the band: "Blab Happy are a cheerful Leicester four piece, smirking between That Petrol Emotion, Blur, and The Beatles". Blab Happy toured in their own right and as support to bands such as Radiohead, Kingmaker, and Squeeze. The band split up in 1993, with singer Mick McCarthy and bassist Tony Owen forming Perfume, who enjoyed the patronage of BBC Radio 1 DJs Steve Lamacq and Jo Whiley, having a minor hit in 1996 with "Haven't Seen You".  Jon Dennis meanwhile formed Slinky, who also won airplay from Lamacq and Whiley with two singles produced by John Robb and were finalists in the 1995 In the City contest.

Dennis and Clay both went on to work as journalists - Dennis writing and presenting podcasts for The Guardian, and Clay for the Leicester Mercury. Clay has also written books, including "Blokes With Balls" and "The Burglar Caught By A Skeleton" Dennis currently records as part of Loaded Knife, whose 2 singles have won support from Rob Da Bank and Lamacq, and the late John Peel.

Videos
Valentine

Discography

Singles
"Turned Out Nice Again" (1987), Wisdom
Fruits Of Our Labour EP (1988), Wisdom
Mad Surge EP (1991), F-Beat
"Never No More" (1991), F-Beat
"Down" (1991), F-Beat
"Inside Out" (1992), F-Beat
Blinding EP (1993), F-Beat

Albums
Boat (1991), F-Beat (a limited edition LP version came with a bonus 12" EP and a poster)
 Down
 You Need Light
 The Silent People
 Inside Out
 Fountain
 Wisecrack Me Up
 Valentine
 Monkey Puzzle
 Whose Driving Freefall
 Someday Soon
 Wisecrack Me Up (Reprise)
 Valentia
 Prospect Hill
 Grief

Bonus 12" EP
 Valentia
 Prospect Hill
 Grief

Smothered (1993), F-Beat
 Sean
 Blinding
 Seven Years
 Bernadette
 Soul Morning
 Butcher
 I Know It's Not Worth Listening
 That's All
 Smothered
 The Hope Song #1
 Tender Hooks
 O Mary Love
 The Hope Song #2
 Fortune's Famous Fool

References

External links 
 Official MySpace page

People from Leicester
Musical groups from Leicester
Musicians from Leicestershire